The year 2017 is the centenary of the independence of Finland.

Incumbents 
 President: Sauli Niinistö
 Prime Minister: Juha Sipilä

Legislative 
 Speaker: Maria Lohela
 First Deputy Speaker: Mauri Pekkarinen
 Second Deputy Speaker: Arto Satonen

Events

February
22 February – Opening ceremony of the FIS Nordic World Ski Championships 2017, hosted in Lahti.

March
1 March – Same-sex marriage is legalized in Finland.
28 March – AS Long as Possible, a GIF-based artwork scheduled to play for 1000 years, launches at the Finnish National Gallery.

August
18 August – 2 people are killed and 8 injured in Turku in the first terrorist attack in Finland since World War II.

December
6 December – Finland celebrates 100 years of independence; the Finnish Prime Minister's Office had earlier created the Finland 100 Years organization to arrange a series of jubilee events.

Deaths 
 May 12: Mauno Koivisto, Finnish politician, former president (born 1923)

References

 
2010s in Finland
Years of the 21st century in Finland
Finland
Finland